Aires Sulivandro Marques Fernandes (born 4 December 1986) is a Cape Verdean international footballer who plays for Interclube, as a midfielder.

Career
Marques has played club football for Sporting Clube da Praia, Mindelense, Sertanense and Interclube.

He made his international debut for Cape Verde in 2013.

References

1986 births
Living people
Cape Verdean footballers
Cape Verde international footballers
Association football midfielders
Sporting Clube da Praia players
CS Mindelense players
Sertanense F.C. players
G.D. Interclube players
Cape Verdean expatriate footballers
Cape Verdean expatriate sportspeople in Portugal
Expatriate footballers in Portugal
Cape Verdean expatriate sportspeople in Angola
Expatriate footballers in Angola